Goski-Wąsosze  (to 2010 known as Gąski-Wąsosze) is a village in the administrative district of Gmina Krzynowłoga Mała, within Przasnysz County, Masovian Voivodeship, in east-central Poland.

The village has a population of 51.

During Nazi Occupation it was part of New Berlin military training area

References

Villages in Przasnysz County